Álvaro Quirós García (born 21 January 1983) is a Spanish professional golfer.

Quirós was born in Guadiaro, a borough of San Roque, Cádiz. He turned professional in 2004.

Professional career
Quirós played on the Challenge Tour in 2006, winning one tournament, and went on to earn his place on the European Tour for the 2007 season by finishing in the top 35 at final qualifying school. He won the first European Tour event he entered as a European Tour card-holder at the Alfred Dunhill Championship, played in South Africa.

Quirós claimed his second European Tour win at the 2008 Portugal Masters, where he finished with birdies at both 17 and 18 on Sunday, to win by three strokes over Paul Lawrie. He ended the season ranked 25th on the final Order of Merit. In January 2009, he won his third European Tour title, at the Commercialbank Qatar Masters, which moved him into the top 50 of the Official World Golf Rankings for the first time. He ended the season ranked 20th on the inaugural Race to Dubai.

Quirós is noted for his length off the tee, and was the longest driver on the European Tour in 2006, 2007 and 2008, averaging nearly 310 yards.

In May 2010, Quirós won the 2010 Open de España by one shot. He finished the season ranked 14th on the Order of Merit, his best finish to date.

Quirós continued his success in 2011. In February, Quiros won his fifth European Tour title, the Dubai Desert Classic. He defeated James Kingston and Anders Hansen by one stroke to take the title. During the final round, Quiros made a hole in one on the par-three 11th. He also won the season ending Dubai World Championship to finish the season ranked 6th on the Order of Merit. He reached a career high of 21 in the Official World Golf Ranking after each of his two European Tour wins in 2011.

Since 2011 his best performances have been third place in the 2014 Volvo China Open and tied for fourth in the 2016 Omega Dubai Desert Classic. Quirós showed a return to form by winning the 2017 Rocco Forte Open in Sicily. Quirós had a 5-shot lead after three rounds and extended this by making four birdies in the first six holes of the final round. However, he then dropped six strokes in the last 10 holes to tie with South African Zander Lombard. In the playoff Lombard made a bogey at the second hole to give Quirós his seventh European Tour win. Quirós has started the event with a world ranking of 703.

Amateur wins
2004 Biarritz Cup (France)

Professional wins (9)

European Tour wins (7)

1Co-sanctioned by the Sunshine Tour

European Tour playoff record (2–0)

Challenge Tour wins (1)

Other wins (1)
2006 Seville Open (Spain)

Results in major championships

CUT = missed the half-way cut
"T" = tied

Summary

Most consecutive cuts made – 2 (2011 Masters – 2011 U.S. Open)
Longest streak of top-10s – 0

Results in The Players Championship

"T" indicates a tie for a place

Results in World Golf Championships

QF, R16, R32, R64 = Round in which player lost in match play
"T" = Tied

Team appearances
Amateur
 European Boys' Team Championship (representing Spain): 2001
 European Youths' Team Championship (representing Spain): 2002, 2004
Eisenhower Trophy (representing Spain): 2004
European Amateur Team Championship (representing Spain): 2003 (winners)

Professional
Seve Trophy (representing Continental Europe): 2009
World Cup (representing Spain): 2011
Royal Trophy (representing Europe): 2013 (winners)

See also
2006 Challenge Tour graduates
2006 European Tour Qualifying School graduates

References

External links
Álvaro Quirós' Official website

Álvaro Quirós at the Sportyard website

Spanish male golfers
European Tour golfers
Sportspeople from San Roque, Cádiz
1983 births
Living people
20th-century Spanish people
21st-century Spanish people